Agyrta klagesi is a moth of the subfamily Arctiinae. It was described by Rothschild in 1912. It is found in Venezuela.

The forewings are velvety black, with a white spot at the apex. The hindwings are black, although the central area from the base almost to the tornus is hyaline.

References

Moths described in 1912
Arctiinae
Moths of South America